Dombóvár is a district in south-western part of Tolna County. Dombóvár is also the name of the town where the district seat is found. The district is located in the Southern Transdanubia Statistical Region.

Geography 
Dombóvár District borders with Tamási District to the north and east, Hegyhát District (Baranya County) to the south, Kaposvár District and Tab District (Somogy County) to the west. The number of the inhabited places in Dombóvár District is 16.

Municipalities 
The district has 1 town and 15 villages.
(ordered by population, as of 1 January 2013)

The bolded municipality is city.

See also
List of cities and towns in Hungary

References

External links
 Postal codes of the Dombóvár District

Districts in Tolna County